Maler is a surname of German origin meaning 'painter'.

People with the surname Maler:
Eva Maler (born 1988), German playwright
Hans Maler zu Schwaz (1480/1488–1526/1529), German painter
Jim Maler (born 1958), American baseball player
Teoberto Maler (1842–1917), German archaeologist

See also
Mahler

Masculine given names